The hiatus semilunaris is bounded inferiorly by the sharp concave margin of the uncinate process of the ethmoid bone, and leads into a curved channel, the infundibulum, bounded above by the bulla ethmoidalis and below by the lateral surface of the uncinate process of the ethmoid.

References

External links
 

Nose